The solo discography of Ringo Sheena features seven studio albums, five compilation albums, two extended plays and twenty-three singles. These were released on the Toshiba EMI sublabel East World from 1998 to 2000, before Shiina moved to the Virgin Music sub-label. In April 2013, EMI Music Japan was absorbed into Universal Music Japan, meaning all releases since 2013 have been on the new EMI R sub-label of Universal.

Albums

Studio albums

Cover albums

Remix albums

Compilation albums

Box sets

Extended plays

Singles

As a lead artist

As a collaborating artist

Promotional singles

Other appearances

See also 
List of bands associated with Ringo Sheena
Ringo Sheena production discography
Ringo Sheena videography
Tokyo Jihen discography

Notes

References

Discography
Discographies of Japanese artists
Pop music discographies
Rock music discographies